In-soo, also spelled In-su, is a Korean unisex given name, predominantly male. The meaning of the name differs based on the hanja used to write each syllable. There are 29 hanja with the reading "in" and 67 hanja with the reading "soo" on the South Korean government's official list of hanja which may be used in given names.

People with this name include:
Seon of Balhae (birth name Dae Insu; died 830), 10th king of Balhae
Pak Paengnyeon (1417–1456), courtesy name Insu, Joseon Dynasty scholar-official
Queen Insu (1437–1504), wife of Crown Prince Uigyeong of Joseon
Insoo Kim Berg (1934–2007), Korean-born American female psychotherapist
Moon In-soo (1945–2021), South Korean male poet
Chun In-soo (born 1965), South Korean male archer 
Insoo Hyun (born c. 1970), American male bioethics professor of Korean descent
Lee In-su (born 1973), South Korean male rower
Kang In-soo (born 1988), South Korean male singer, member of boy band Myname
Yu In-soo (born 1994), South Korean male football midfielder in Japan

See also
List of Korean given names

References

Korean unisex given names